The Piton des Neiges (Snow Peak) is a massive  shield volcano on Réunion, one of the French volcanic islands in the Mascarene Archipelago in the southwestern Indian Ocean. Piton des Neiges is the highest point on Réunion and is considered to be the highest point in the Indian Ocean. The volcano was formed by the Réunion hotspot and emerged from the sea about two million years ago. Now deeply eroded, the volcano has been inactive for 20,000 years and is surrounded by three massive crater valleys, the Cirques. Piton des Neiges forms the northwestern two thirds of Réunion, with the very active Piton de la Fournaise comprising the rest. As its name suggests, snow is occasionally seen on its summit in winter.

The volcanic island is considered to be about three million years old (Pliocene); the other two islands in the archipelago, Mauritius and Rodrigues, are 7.8 million (Miocene) and 1 million (Pleistocene) years old, respectively. The island possesses a high endemism of flowering plants (about 225); this has justified the creation of a biological reserve on the lower slopes of the Piton des Neiges.

Tourism

There are three medium-difficulty tracks leading up to the peak, one from the Cirque de Salazie, one from the Cirque de Cilaos and one from La Plaine des Cafres. They meet at a staffed mountain hut about an hour's walk below the peak at la Caverne Dufour. Walkers often arrive there after a long day trek up the mountain, and start out very early the next day to watch the sunrise from the summit. The hike can be done in a long one-day 10- to 12-hour hike, but it is often preferable to make it a two-day hike - many hikers like to get up early on the second day and make the (easy) remaining ascent with torches, so as to see the sunrise from the mountaintop. The mountain hut offers heated indoor lodging, outdoor tent lodging, and meals. It is best to make reservations.

The hike starting from Cilaos is about 6.5 hours up and 4 hours down. To reach the start of the hike, drive through Cilaos toward la Mare à St Joseph. About  past Cilaos, you will see a sign and some parking on both sides of the street. You may also leave your car downtown and follow the road to the trail head (sometimes there is no parking at the trail head). The hike is very steep (a climb of 1700m or 5,577 ft from trail head, almost 2000m or 6,562 ft from downtown), and one should be cautious if the trail is wet. The trail is well marked.

The trail is well marked.

See also

 List of volcanoes in Réunion
 List of islands by highest point
 List of Ultras of Africa
 Piton des Neiges – Gros Morne Important Bird Area

References

External links
 Reunion island
 Hike starting from la Plaine des Cafres

Mountains of Réunion
Volcanoes of Réunion
Shield volcanoes of France
Hotspot volcanoes
Dormant volcanoes
Pliocene shield volcanoes
Pleistocene shield volcanoes
Polygenetic shield volcanoes
Réunion National Park
Highest points of French national parks